Moor End Academy is a converter academy school located in Crosland Moor, Huddersfield in England. It educates students in ages 11–16. South Pennine Academies operates the institution. The school is rated 'Outstanding' by Ofsted.

History
The school, that opened in Easter 1972, was originally known as Moor End High School. It became a Technology College, as part of the specialist schools programme, in 1999 and it was renamed to Moor End Technology College. The school gained academy status, and was renamed again, this time to Moor End Academy, in September 2011. Louise Couzens-Abbot resigned as Chair of Governors, in March 2013, when it was revealed that she was a sex worker.

The controlling body Moor End Academies Trust changed its name to South Pennine Academies on 27 July 2017. This was due to the building of a new primary school on Moor End grounds, it was opened in 2016

Organisation
The Academy has a house system of four houses: Beaumont, Castle, Emley, Greenhead (although it is currently being reworked). The roles of Head Boy and Head Girl were introduced in the year 2013-14. Kash Rafiq, a former pupil at the school, was appointed Principal in April 2018.

Academic standards
The latest Ofsted report, following an inspection in June 2012, rated the academy as 'Outstanding', grade 1 of four grades, for 'overall effectiveness' and for each of the four component measures. The report says "High aspirations, outstanding teaching and the rich curriculum result in outstanding achievement. Achievement is outstanding because students consistently make significantly more progress than students nationally in English, science and mathematics."

Following the previous inspection, in September/October 2009, the school was also assessed as being 'Outstanding'.

Notable former student
 Clare Taylor (born 1965), English sportswoman

Notes

External links
 

Schools in Huddersfield
Academies in Kirklees
Secondary schools in Kirklees
Educational institutions established in 1972
1972 establishments in England